Piane Crati is a town and comune in the province of Cosenza in the Calabria region of southern Italy.

Located in the Crati river valley, 12 km from Cosenza, it is the smallest town in Calabria. 
The town was severely damaged in an earthquake on 27 March 1638.

References

External links
Official website

Cities and towns in Calabria